Modular Presents: Leave Them All Behind is a double disc sampling of some of the big names in 2005 in dance-rock, indie-rock, dance-punk, post-punk and the like. Put together by the Australian label Modular Recordings, the compilation has 32 original and remix versions of tracks by artists such as Bloc Party ("Banquet"), Death From Above 1979 ("Romantic Rights"), The Killers ("Mr. Brightside") and Cut Copy ("Bright Neon Payphone"). Disc 1 is continuously mixed by the Modular DJs, while Disc 2 is unmixed.

Track listing
Disc 1
 "Retreat" by The Rakes
 "Bright Neon Payphone" by Cut Copy
 "Romantic Rights (Erol Alkan Remix)" by Death From Above 1979
 "Giddy Stratospheres" by The Long Blondes
 "Poor Innocent Boys" by Cazals
 "Transpiralo" by Panico
 "Banquet (Phones Disco Edit)" by Bloc Party
 "I See You" by Rubicks
 "Single Again" by Fiery Furnaces
 "I Ain't Saying Goodbye" by Tom Vek
 "Leave Them All Behind" by Whitey
 "45 & Rising (Cut Copy Remix)" by Midnight Juggernauts
 "Me & My Man (Whitey Remix)" by Chromeo
 "Shake Off" by Kiki & Silversurfer (featuring Captain Comatose)
 "You Take My Breath Away (Mylo Remix)" by The Knife
 "Girl & The Sea (Cut Copy Remix)" by The Presets
 "Good Ones (Jagz Kooner Remix)" by The Kills
 "Mr Brightside" by The Killers

Disc 2
 "Banquet (Phones Remix)" by Bloc Party
 "Leave Them All Behind" by Whitey
 "Giddy Stratosphere" by Long Blondes
 "Shake Off" by Kiki & Silversurfer
 "The Retreat (Phones Mix)" by The Rakes
 "Poor Innocent Boys" by The Cazals
 "Transpiralo" by Panico
 "Night On Fire (Cut Copy Remix)" by VHS or Beta
 "Summer Of Love" by Presets
 "Needy Girl (Paper Faces Remix)" by Chromeo
 "E Talkin (Tiga remix)" by Soulwax
 "Single Again" by Fiery Furnaces
 "Dance Me In (Optimo Mix)" by Sons and Daughters
 "Romantic Rights (Erol Alkan Remix)" by Death From Above 1979

Record label compilation albums
2005 compilation albums
Modular Recordings compilation albums
Dance-rock compilation albums
Indie rock compilation albums
Dance-punk albums
Post-punk compilation albums